GreenRiver was an American restaurant and cocktail bar located in the Streeterville neighborhood of Chicago, Illinois. It was a collaborative effort between Danny Meyer's Union Square Hospitality Group and hospitality group Best Bar in the World. The partnership also produced a smaller bar, Annex. The restaurant highlighted the Irish experience in Chicago, with cocktails named for famous Irish citizens, including Mary Harris Jones and Edward O'Hare.

Despite early success and the receipt of a Michelin Star in both 2017 and 2018, the restaurant closed in early 2018.

See also
 List of Michelin starred restaurants in Chicago

References

Restaurants established in 2015
Defunct restaurants in Chicago
2015 establishments in Illinois
2018 disestablishments in Illinois
Restaurants disestablished in 2018